Hòa Thuận is a township of Quảng Hòa District, Cao Bằng Province, Vietnam.

Until February 2020, the township was the district capital of former Phục Hòa District.

References

Populated places in Cao Bằng province
Townships in Vietnam